Pitcairnia mooreana is a plant species in the genus Pitcairnia. This species is endemic to Mexico.

References

mooreana
Flora of Mexico